The American Society of Agricultural and Biological Engineers (ASABE) is an international professional society devoted to agricultural and biological engineering. It was founded in December 1907 at the University of Wisconsin–Madison as the American Society of Agricultural Engineers (ASAE) and is now based in St. Joseph, Michigan. Today the organization has about 9,000 members in over 100 countries. ASABE serves many functions: it provides a forum for communication of research findings through conferences, scientific journals, and a magazine; it develops standards of practice; it provides opportunities for members to network. It cooperates with the Alpha Epsilon honor society.

After years of debate, members of the organization voted in 2005 to modify the name to better reflect the changes in the profession. For many years, the discipline had broadened to include engineering for biological systems, and the name change simply reflected this reality. Most of the university departments of agricultural engineering had already changed their names. The increase in biological engineering led to a number of breakthroughs that greatly affected the global agriculture system of modern society. Genetically modified organisms for instance have led to massive overhauls in food production, logistics and trade.

ASABE is the lead society in ABET evaluation for agricultural and biological academic program evaluation in the United States. It is a cooperating society for bioengineering/biomedical, environmental engineering and healthcare engineering technology.

ASABE encourages engineering excellence through professional licensure. The society's committee on licensure maintains and enhances the professionalism of the members of ASABE by providing services related to the national Principles and Practices Examination (PE Exam) for agricultural and biological engineering.

Organization

ASABE comprises eight technical communities that advance the mission of the organization through publishing, continuing professional development, and standards development:
Applied Science and Engineering
Energy Systems
Ergonomics, Safety, and Health
Information Technology, Sensors, and Control Systems
Machinery Systems
Natural Resources and Environment Systems
Plant, Animal and Facility Systems
Processing Systems

Publications
The society publishes three peer-reviewed journals:
Journal of the ASABE
Applied Engineering in Agriculture 
Journal of Agricultural Safety and Health

References

https://www.abet.org/member-societies/

External links
 Official website

Agricultural organizations based in the United States
Engineering societies based in the United States
Biology societies
Organizations based in Michigan
Berrien County, Michigan
Organizations established in 1907
1907 establishments in Wisconsin